Singles ward may refer to:

 A type of ward in the Church of Jesus Christ of Latter-day Saints
 The Singles Ward, a 2002 film about fictional events surrounding such a ward
 The Singles 2nd Ward, a 2007 sequel to the above film